ROU 26 Vanguardia is a Piast class salvage and marine research vessel in service with the Uruguayan Navy. The ship was laid down for the East German Navy in 1976, before being acquired by the German government after the Reunification of Germany. The ship was purchased by the Republic of Uruguay in 1991 and renamed Vanguardia. .

History 
ROU Vanguardia was laid down as a Piast class salvage and rescue vessel (Bergungsschiff) for the East German Navy on 28 December 1976. The ship was built in Gdansk, Poland using designs provided by the Polish Navy. She was commissioned into the Volksmarine as the 570 Otto von Guericke, named for 17th century Prussian scientist Otto von Guericke. Following the 1990 Reunification of German and the dissolution of the National People's Army, the ship was absorbed into the German fleet reserve. The Otto von Guericke was acquired by the Uruguayan Navy in October 1991, refitted and renamed the ROU 26 Vanguardia, and entered Uruguayan service in 1992.

Current role 
Vanguardia currently serves as marine research and rescue vessel. Much of the vessel's role in the Uruguayan fleet revolves around the transport of supplies and passengers to Antarctica. The ships makes an annual trip to King George Island to deliver supplies. In November 2017 the Vanguardia was deployed as part of the rescue operations following the loss of the submarine ARA San Juan in the South Atlantic.

The ship was celebrated for 26 years in Uruguayan service in December 2018.

References 

Ships built in Gdańsk
Ships of the National Navy of Uruguay
1976 ships
Naval ships built in Poland for export